Tata Bojs is a Czech pop rock band, formed in 1988 by bass-player Mardoša and drummer/singer Milan Cais. The band plays electronic pop music. The band is famous for its creative lyrics and word play. The current line-up of the band includes guitarist Vladimír Bár, producer Dušan Neuwerth on guitar and Jiří Hradil on piano and keyboards. The band won the award for Best Group at the 2004 Anděl Awards.

Discography

Albums 
1991 Šagali Šagáli
1995 Ladovo album
1997 Jaro/Divnosti
1997 Ukončete nás
1998 Nekonečná stanice
2000 Futuretro
2001 Termixes
2002 Biorytmy
2002 Attention!
2003 Šagalí léta 89-97
2004 Nanoalbum
2007 Kluci kde ste?
2008 smetana (with Ahn Trio)
2011 Ležatá osmička (∞)
2013 Hity a city
2015 A/B
2017 Tata Bojs & SOČR Live
2020 Jedna nula

DVD 
2005 Nanotour
2012 Ležatá Letná

Books 
2004 Nanobook

Awards 
Anděl Awards
2004 Best Group

References

External links 

Czech rock music groups
1988 establishments in Czechoslovakia
Musical groups established in 1988